Bird Sim Coler (October 9, 1867 Urbana, Illinois – June 12, 1941 Brooklyn, New York) was an American stockbroker and politician from Brooklyn, New York. He served as the first New York City Comptroller after the city's 1898 consolidation and was the Democratic nominee for Governor of New York in 1902. He narrowly lost the election to Governor Benjamin Odell Jr.

Biography

Personal
Coler was born on October 9, 1868, in Urbana, Illinois, the son of William N. Coler and wife. The elder Coler established a banking house after the Civil War and brought his family to Brooklyn.

The younger Coler was educated at Brooklyn Polytechnic Institute.

Coler and Emily Moore, the daughter of Mr. and Mrs. Benjamin Moore, were married on October 1, 1888. He died on June 12, 1941, in Brooklyn, and she died on August 23, 1941, in the same hospital. They had a son, Eugene Bird Coler.

Career
He established himself as a stockbroker in New York City, became prominent in municipal and State politics, and was first Comptroller of Greater New York, from 1897 to 1901. In 1902, he was the Democratic nominee for Governor of New York, but lost to Benjamin B. Odell, Jr., by a small plurality in spite of his enormous lead in New York City. In 1905 he was elected president of the Borough of Brooklyn, on the Municipal Ownership ticket. In 1918, he ran unsuccessfully on the Democratic ticket for New York State Comptroller.

He was the author of Commercialism in Politics, Two and Two Make Four, He Made Them Twain, and other sociological works.

Legacy
Coler-Goldwater Specialty Hospital on Roosevelt Island bears his name.

References

External links

 The Political Graveyard entry

People from Brooklyn
New York City Comptrollers
Brooklyn borough presidents
Candidates in the 1904 United States presidential election
American political writers
People from Champaign, Illinois
1867 births
1941 deaths
Burials at Green-Wood Cemetery
American stockbrokers
19th-century American politicians
20th-century American politicians
20th-century American non-fiction writers
20th-century American male writers
American male non-fiction writers